This is a list of battles recorded in the Annals of the Four Masters, written in the 17th century, as taking place in prehistoric Ireland. Many of the battles listed are purely mythological, and none are historically reliable. Other Irish annalistic and chronicle sources differ in their chronologies.

Battles

Anno Mundi
Reign of Ceasair, 2242-???? - No warfare.
Reign of Parthalon, 2520–50
 2530 - Magh Ithe, first recorded battle in Ireland.
Reign of Neimhidh, 2850–59
 Murbholg, in Dál Riata
 Baghna
 Cnamh Ross
Reign of Eochaidh mac Erc, 3294-3304.
 3304 - First Battle of Magh Tuireadh, in Conmaicne Toland.
Reign of Nuadhat Airgeatlamh, 3311-30.
 3330 - Second Battle of Magh Tuireadh
Reign of Lugh Lamhfhada, 3330-3370.
 3370 - Caendruim.
Joint-Reign of Mac Cuill, Mac Cecht, and Mac Greine, 3471-3500.
 3500 - Sliabh Mis, Tuatha de Danann defeated by the sons of Milidh
3500 - Tailtinn.
Joint-Reign of Eremhon and Emher, 3501.
 3501 - Geisill, fought at Tochar Eter Da Mhagh near Bri Damh
Reign of Eremhon 3502-16.
 3502 - Cuil Caichir
 3503 - Biletineadh
 3506 - Breogan, in Feimhin
 3510 - Comhraire, in Meath
Joint Reign of Muimhne, Luighne, Laighne, sons of Eremon, 3517-19.
 3519 - Ard Ladhron
Joint-Reign of Er, Orba, Fearon, Fergen, sons of Emher, first half of 3519.
 3519 - Cuil Marta
Reign of Irial Faidh, 3519-329.
 Ard Inmaoith, in Teathbha
 Tenmaighe
 Lochmaighe
Reign of Conmael  3549-79.
 3549 - Raeire
 Geisill
 Berra
 Sliabh Beatha, in Ui Creamhthainn
 Ucha
 Cnucha
 Sliabh Modhairn
 Clere
 Carnmor
 Loch Lein
 Ele
 3579 - Aenach Macha
Reign of Tighearnmas, 3580-3656.
 Elle
 Lochmagh
 Cul Ard, in Magh Inis
 Cuil Fraechan
 Magh Techt
 Commar
 Cul Athguirt, in Seimhne
 Ard Niadh, in Connaught
 Carn Fearadhaigh
 Cnamh Choill, in Connaught
 Cuil Feadha
 Reabh
 Congnaidhe, Tuath Eabha
 Cluain Cuas, in Teathbha
 Cluain Muirsge, in Breifne
 Two Battles of Cuil, in Argat Ross
 Ele
 Berra
 Seven Battles of Loch Lughdhach
 Two Further Battles of Argat Ross
 Three Battles of the Firbolgs
 Cuil Fothair
Reign of Eochaidh Eadghadhach, 3664-67.
 3667 - Teamhair
Joint-Reign of Sobhairce and Cearmna Finn, sons of Ebric mac Emher: 3668-3707.
Reign of Eochaidh Faebhar Ghlas mac Conmael: 3708-3727.
 Luachair Deadhadh
 Fosadh Da Ghort
 Comar Tri nUisge
 Tuaim Drecon, in Ui Briuin Breifne
 Druim Liathain
 3727 - Carman
Reign of Fiacha Labhrainne: 3728-51.
 Gathlach
 Fairrge
 Sliabh Feimhin
 Magh Ernai
 3751- Bealgadan
Reign of Eochaidh Mumho mac Mofebis: 3752-72.
 3772 - Cliach
Reign of Aengus Olmucadha mac Fiacha Labhrainne: 3773-90.
 Clere
 Cuirce
 Sliabh Cailge, in Corca Bhaiscinn
 Ros Fraechan, in Muirisc
 Carn Riceadha
 Cuil Ratha, in South Munster
 Sliabh Cua
 Ard Achadh
 Fifty Battles of the Cruithean Tuath and Firbolgs
 Twelve Battles of the Longbardai
 Four battles of the Colaisti
 3790 - Carmann
Reign of Enna Airgtheach: 3791-3817.
 3817 - Raighne
 4815 - Tara.
 4907 - Ard Crimhthainn.
 5089 - Aillinn.
 5090 - Cliach, in Ui Drona.
 5160 - Bruighean Da Dhearg

Anno Domini
 76   - Aichill
 106  - Moin An Chatha, in Magh Line, Dal Araidhe.
 122  - Magh hAgha
 157  - Tuath Amrois.
 186  - Ceannfeabhrat.
 195  - battle of Maigh Mucruimhe.
 226  - Crinna, in Brega.
 236  - Eu, Magh nAi.
 236  - Eth.
 236  - Ceann Daire.
 236  - Sruth.
 236  - Slighe Cuailgne.
 237  - Ath Beatha
 237  - Dumha
 238  - Three Battles of Cuiltochair.
 238  - Three Battles of Dubhadh.
 239  - Allamagh
 239  - Seven Battles of Elve
 240  - Magh Techt
 241  - Berre
 241  - Loch Lein
 241  - Luimneach
 241  - Grian
 241  - Classach
 241  - Muiresc
 241  - Fearta
 241  - Samhain
 241  - Ard Cam
 241  - Massacre of Cleanfearta
 248  - Fochard Muirtheimhne
 262  - Crionna Fregabhail
 265  - Seven Battles of the Desi
 271  - Year of The Three Battles
 272  - Year of The Four Battles
 283  - Ath Brea, on the Boyne
 283  - Cath Inverollarba
 283  - Cath Comar (the Battle of Comar).
 283  - Cath Gabhra (the Battle of Gowra).
 283  - Cath Ollabar (the Battle of Ollabar).
 284  - Gabhra Aichle
 285  - Ollarba, in Magh Line
 291  - Duibhlinn
 291  - The Three Battles of Sliabh Toadh
 291  - Smear
 291  - Ciarmhagh
 322  - Dubhchomar, in Crioch Rois, in Breagh
 331  - Achadh Leithdheirg, in Fearnmhagh
 356  - Portrigh

Notes

References

See also
Irish battles